Marjolein Decroix  (born 17 March 1992) is a Belgian alpine skier, born in Poperinge. 
She competed in slalom at the 2018 Winter Olympics.

References

External links

1992 births
Living people
People from Poperinge
Belgian female alpine skiers
Olympic alpine skiers of Belgium
Alpine skiers at the 2018 Winter Olympics
Sportspeople from West Flanders